Lars Niklas Bergström (born 18 August 1974) is a Swedish sport shooter. He has been selected to compete for Sweden in running target shooting at the 2004 Summer Olympics, and has won a total of seventeen medals in a major international competition, spanning the ISSF World Cup series, the World Championships, and the European Championships. Bergstrom trains under head coach Claes Johansson for the national running target team, while shooting at Glaskogens JSK in Glava.

Career
Bergström qualified for his first and only Swedish squad in the last Olympic running target competition at the 2004 Summer Olympics in Athens. He finished behind U.S. shooter and three-time Olympian Adam Saathoff in a runner-up position at the ISSF World Cup meet a year earlier in Suhl, Germany to secure an Olympic berth for Sweden, and eventually join with fellow marksman Emil Andersson for the national team. Bergstrom marked a steady 286 in the slow-target portion and 285 in the fast-moving round to accumulate a total score of 571 points in the qualifying round, shutting him out of the Olympic final to twelfth in a 19-shooter field.

At the 2009 World Running Target Championships in Vierumäki, Finland, Bergström held off a strenuous challenge from Russia's Igor Kolessov to capture his first ever Worlds medal in a bronze medal duel 20 to 19, finishing third at 391 points.

References

External links

Athlete Bio – Swedish Olympic Committee 

1974 births
Living people
Swedish male sport shooters
Olympic shooters of Sweden
Shooters at the 2004 Summer Olympics
Sportspeople from Karlstad
Running target shooters
20th-century Swedish people
21st-century Swedish people